The Mau–Ghazipur–Dildarnagar main line connects  and  in the Indian state of Uttar Pradesh and comes under the jurisdiction of North Eastern Railway zone & East Central Railway zone.

Overview
This line is divided into three Phases and the total length of this route is 
A  Long Rail-cum-Road Bridge on River Ganga is being made under this phase.

Project
The estimated cost of the project is Rs 1,765.92 crore and the expected completion cost is Rs 2,109.07 crore with five percent escalation per annum.
After completion it would bigger beneficial for the Howrah–New Delhi route and boom for economical development of Eastern Uttar Pradesh and also reduction of travelling through Mau.

References

5 ft 6 in gauge railways in India

Railway lines in Uttar Pradesh

Railway lines opened in 2015